Elizabeth Anne Staiger (January 10, 1928 – September 25, 2019), known as Libi Staiger, was an American actress who primarily worked on stage.  Her career, which included roles on Broadway from 1953, was ended by the failure of her first starring vehicle, 1963's Sophie, a musical-comedy life story of entertainer Sophie Tucker.

Staiger was born in Harrisburg, Illinois, and died in Austin, Texas.

Performances

Theatre
 Sophie (Sophie), Winter Garden Theatre, New York, April 15–20, 1963.
 Destry Rides Again (Chloe; standby for Frenchie), Imperial Theatre, New York, April 23, 1959 - June 18, 1960.
 The Most Happy Fella (Cleo), London Coliseum, London, opened April 21, 1960.

Film
Hanky Panky (1982) - Buck's Wife

Television
 Kate & Allie in episode Dressed to Kill, December 23, 1985.

References

External links
 
 

1928 births
2019 deaths
20th-century American actresses
Actresses from Illinois
American musical theatre actresses
American stage actresses
People from Harrisburg, Illinois
21st-century American women